The Armistead Monument is a bronze statue of Col. George Armistead, by Edward Berge.
It is located at Fort McHenry, Baltimore.
It was dedicated on September 12, 1914.

The inscription reads:
(Sculpture, rear of bronze base, proper right:)
CAST BY ROMAN BRONZE WORKS NY 
(Sculpture, rear of bronze base, proper left:) 
BERGE 
(Base, front:) 

(Base, left side:) 

(Base, right side:) 

(Base, rear: list of names of the commission) 
signed founder's mark appears.

See also
List of public art in Baltimore
Fort McHenry

References

External links
http://monumentcity.net/2009/03/02/armistead-monument-at-fort-mchenry-baltimore-md/

1914 establishments in Maryland
1914 sculptures
Artworks in the collection of the National Park Service
Bronze sculptures in Maryland
Buildings and structures in Baltimore
Landmarks in Baltimore
Locust Point, Baltimore
Monuments and memorials in Maryland
Sculptures of men in Maryland
Statues in Maryland
Tourist attractions in Baltimore
Armistead Monument